The NS Mat '64 or Materieel '64 were electric multiple units (EMU) built by Werkspoor and later by Duewag and Waggonfabrik Talbot between 1961 and 1976. They were operated in the Netherlands by the Nederlandse Spoorwegen (NS) until 2016. The equipment consisted of independent four and two-car train sets called Plan T and Plan V: the Plan T is a 4-car EMU, and the Plan V is a 2-car EMU. Materieel '64 is sometimes nicknamed 'Apekoppen' (literal translation: 'monkey heads') and 'Standaard Stoptrein' ('Standard slow train') due to their distinct shape. 

Plan V was, for many years, with 246 units (although only 245 were present at the same time), the largest series of Nederlandse Spoorwegen rolling stock, until the arrival of the VIRM. A number of train sets were also leased to and used by various regional carriers. Materieel '64 has been in service for 55 years, from 1961 to 2016, on the Dutch railway network.

Appearance 
The Materieel '64 rolling stock has a convex nose, like the Materieel '54 rolling stock, to protect the train operator in case of an accident. It, however, sticks out less far than the Materieel '54 rolling stock and looks more like the Plan U rolling stock nose. 

Originally, Plan T and the 30 oldest Plan V train sets were green with a light yellow band. From the in 1968 delivered 431 train set onwards, they were delivered in the new NS color scheme, which consisted of a yellow with gray and slanted blue advertising tracks. The reason for this, was to give the railways a new impetus in the context of Spoorslag '70. The older green train sets also received the new color scheme in the following years.

Manufacturing 
The Materieel '64 prototype, Plan TT (Treinstel Toekomst, translation: 'Trainset Future') 501, was built by Werkspoor in 1961. In the years 1964-1965 the follow-up series Plan T was built and delivered in three partial series. Most trains where scrapped.

Plan V was delivered in 13 partial series in ten years (from 1966 to 1976). The first train set was already scrapped before the last train sets were delivered. The last two series (V12 and V13) are as old or even newer than the oldest SGM train sets. As of 2016, all of the train sets have been put out of service.

Design 
The Materieel '64 design is derived from the DMU Plan U, which had been built a few years prior. It was the first rolling stock with the later frequently used swivel doors. The Scharfenberg coupler allows the train to travel as a consist, but not with other rolling stock. A notable difference between Plan T and Plan V is the number of train carriages: four (Plan T) and two (Plan V) respectively - the letter is therefore not the initial letter of the number of train carriages. Furthermore, the corner windows on the cabin at the head of the train were painted gray on Plan T and yellow on Plan V.

Notable Materieel '64 innovations compared to older rolling stock included: 
 double one-legged pantograph in the middle
 buttons on the inside and outside of the train for opening and closing the doors with central door lock (the conductor no longer has to walk along the train to close the doors)
 locked doors (passengers are no longer able to open the doors during the journey)
 electronic departure signal (the operator sees a light on his instrument panel and no longer has to wait until the conductor gives the departure signal)
 destination sign
Older train sets and carriages were later provided with central door lock and broadcasting system.

Not everything was renewed, for example, the characteristic heavy engine noise was maintained and the train sets all had a brake pad, a braking system in which a cast iron block is pushed onto the wheel tire when the train set starts to brake. This brake system leads to a roughening of the running surface, making the tire rolling noise high. More modern trains have a disc brake, which makes these trains quieter. The brake pad also causes a loud screeching sound at the end of the braking distance.

Withdrawal
In July 2010 the last Plan T EMUs were taken out of service. As of December 2012, only a small amount of routes were being served by Materieel '64 normally. They also had been used widely in 2010 and 2012 winters when many newer SLT's were out of service, due to winter problems.

In 2015 there were still 40 Plan V sets in service, used on stopping services outside the Randstad.

In late 2015, Nederlandse Spoorwegen announced the withdrawal of the remaining Plan V sets in the 2016 timetable, starting in December 2015. However, due to a shortage of rolling stock, several sets were kept in service until the 4th of April 2016, when the last sets were finally taken out of service. Many sets have been scrapped.

Details
In total there were 246 Plan V sets and 31 Plan T sets built, the table shows details of these sets.

Services operated
The services that remained for Mat '64 in 2015 are listed below. These were all taken over by other rolling stock from April 2016 onwards.

Timetable 2016
Since the beginning of timetable 2016, which started on December 13, 2015, the Nederlandse Spoorwegen planned to take all Materieel '64 trains out of service. However, that was not possible because there was a lack of deployable trains. That is also the reason why the Materieel ’64 trains could still be seen on some routes in early 2016. However, the trains were not scheduled to drive following a schedule; they will be operating on routes where they’re needed instead. In many cases, they will be seen on the same routes as they were driving on in 2015.

From the original 246 Materieel ’64 Plan V trains, the following 28 trains remain available for service; nrs. 441, 443, 444, 446, 447, 449–458, 463–466, 469, 471, 474, 475, 478–480, 482 and 965. These were all taken out of service on the 4th of April 2016.

Gallery

References

External links

Electric multiple units of the Netherlands
Waggonfabrik Talbot
Train-related introductions in 1961
1500 V DC multiple units of the Netherlands